Last of the Summer Wine's 31st and final series was aired in 2010, beginning on 25 July. All six episodes in series 31 were 30 minutes in length. All of the episodes were written by Roy Clarke and directed by Alan J. W. Bell.

The series was the first in 19 years to be only six episodes long, due in part to the BBC axing the show and then recommissioning it. Actress Juliette Kaplan (Pearl) wrote on her website that the series was a result of fan response to rumours of the show's axing in December 2008, whilst director Alan J. W. Bell also credited the series to fan reaction.

The series continued with the same trio from series 30, with Russ Abbot (Hobbo), Burt Kwouk (Entwistle), and Brian Murphy (Alvin). Peter Sallis (Clegg) and Frank Thornton (Truly), who were previously central characters, remained, but were now secondary characters, only taping studio scenes owing to the cost of insurance for actors of their advanced age on location. Jane Freeman (Ivy) also filmed only in-studio scenes.

On 2 June 2010, the BBC announced that the 31st series would be the last, despite the show still having a loyal fan base. To commemorate the show's final appearance, the BBC broadcast Songs of Praise from Holmfirth, and a special edition of Countryfile about Holmfirth and the surrounding area (where the series was primarily filmed). The Countryfile special aired on 25 July straight after the first episode of the final series. Songs of Praise from Holmfirth aired on 29 August, the day the last ever episode was broadcast.

That final episode, "How Not to Cry at Weddings", was dubbed "The Very Last of the Summer Wine" in the Radio Times edition dated 28 August – 3 September 2010. However, that title modification was not used when the episode was transmitted. The Radio Times edition also included a feature on actor Sallis, headlined "It never occurred to me that I could be an actor".

Outline
The trio in this series consisted of:

Last appearances
This being the last series, all twenty remaining cast characters made their final appearances. Ivy and Nelly's final appearances were in the penultimate episode, "Look Whose Wheel's Come Off". The remaining eighteen signed off in the final episode, "How Not to Cry at Weddings", most notably Norman Clegg, who appeared in every one of the 295 episodes. The episode was also the final acting turn for Clegg's actor Peter Sallis before his death in 2017.

List of episodes

DVD release
The box set for series 31 was released by Universal Playback in August 2016, mislabelled as a box set for series 31 & 32.

References

See also

Last of the Summer Wine series
2010 British television seasons